Yadollah (yad-ullah) is a male given name common in Iran and some other countries. The name is of Arabic origin and means "Allah's (God's) hand".

People named Yadollah
Yadollah Bigdeli (1883-1960), Iranian army commander
Yadollah Sahabi  (1905–2002), Iranian scholar, writer and politician
Yadollah Maftun Amini (born 1926), Iranian poet
Yadollah Royaee (born 1932), Iranian poet
Yadollah Duzduzani (born 1935), Iranian Twelver Shi'a Marja
Yadollah Sharifirad (born 1946), Iranian fighter pilot and writer
Yadollah Kaboli Khansari (born 1949), Iranian calligrapher
Yadollah Samadi (born 1951), Iranian film director
Yadollah Mortazavi (born 1958), Iranian professor of chemical engineering
Yadollah Jahanbazi (born 1973), Iranian football referee
Yadollah Akbari (born 1974), Iranian footballer
Yadollah Eslami, Iranian newspaper editor
Yadollah Javadpour, Iranian fighter pilot
Yadollah Javani, Iranian military politician

Places
Hajj Yadollah Mahalleh, village in Chubar Rural District, Haviq District, Talesh County, Gilan Province, Iran
Mazraeh-ye Yadollah Jafari, village in Fasarud Rural District, in the Central District of Darab County, Fars Province, Iran
Chalderaz-e Yadollah, village in Barez Rural District, Manj District, Lordegan County, Chaharmahal and Bakhtiari Province, Iran
Tolombeh-ye Ashayiri Yadollah va Shorka, village in Deh Kahan Rural District, Aseminun District, Manujan County, Kerman Province, Iran
Tolombeh-ye Yadollah Khalaj, village in Hana Rural District, Abadeh Tashk District, Neyriz County, Fars Province, Iran
Qeshlaq-e Hajj Dowlat Yadollah, village in Qeshlaq-e Shomali Rural District, in the Central District of Parsabad County, Ardabil Province, Iran
Tolombeh-ye Yadollah Sheybani, village in Golestan Rural District, in the Central District of Sirjan County, Kerman Province, Iran
Tolombeh-ye Hajj Yadollah Ghorba, village in Golestan Rural District, in the Central District of Sirjan County, Kerman Province, Iran
Tolombeh-ye Yadollah Ghorbapur, village in Golestan Rural District, in the Central District of Sirjan County, Kerman Province, Iran
Mowtowr Pamp-e Yadollah Akbari Mowtowr-e Khalifehay 6, village in Vakilabad Rural District, in the Central District of Arzuiyeh County, Kerman Province, Iran
Tolombeh-ye Hajj Yadollah Abbaslu va Shorka, village in Golestan Rural District, in the Central District of Sirjan County, Kerman Province, Iran

Arabic masculine given names